<noinclude>

There are several families of symmetric polytopes with irreducible symmetry which have a member in more than one dimensionality. These are tabulated here with Petrie polygon projection graphs and Coxeter–Dynkin diagrams.{| class="wikitable collapsible uncollapsed" 
!colspan=12|Table of irreducible polytope families
|-
!Familyn
! n-simplex
! n-hypercube
! n-orthoplex
! n-demicube
! 1k2
! 2k1
! k21
!colspan=2|pentagonal polytope
|-
!Group
!colspan=1|An
!colspan=2|Bn
!colspan=1|

!colspan=3|

!colspan=2|Hn
|-
! 2
|align=center|
Triangle
|colspan=2 align=center|
Square
|align=center BGCOLOR="#f0e0e0"|p-gon(example: p=7)
|align=center colspan=3 BGCOLOR="#e0e0f0"|Hexagon
|colspan=2 align=center|Pentagon
|- 
! 3
|align=center|Tetrahedron
|align=center|Cube
|align=center|Octahedron
|align=center|Tetrahedron
|align=center colspan=3| 
|align=center|Dodecahedron
|align=center|Icosahedron
|-
! 4
|align=center|5-cell
|align=center|
Tesseract
|align=center|16-cell
|align=center|
Demitesseract
|align=center colspan=3 BGCOLOR="#e0f0e0"|24-cell
|align=center|120-cell
|align=center|600-cell
|- 
! 5
|align=center|5-simplex
|align=center|5-cube
|align=center|5-orthoplex
|align=center|5-demicube
|align=center colspan=3| 
|align=center colspan=1| 
|
|- 
! 6
|align=center|6-simplex
|align=center|6-cube
|align=center|6-orthoplex
|align=center|6-demicube
|align=center BGCOLOR="#f0e0e0"|122
|colspan=2 align=center BGCOLOR="#f0e0e0"|221
|align=center colspan=1| 
|
|- 
! 7
|align=center|7-simplex
|align=center|7-cube
|align=center|7-orthoplex
|align=center|7-demicube
|align=center BGCOLOR="#f0e0e0"|132
|align=center BGCOLOR="#f0e0e0"|231
|align=center BGCOLOR="#f0e0e0"|321
|align=center colspan=1| 
|
|- 
! 8
|align=center|8-simplex
|align=center|8-cube
|align=center|8-orthoplex
|align=center|8-demicube
|align=center BGCOLOR="#f0e0e0"|142
|align=center BGCOLOR="#f0e0e0"|241
|align=center BGCOLOR="#f0e0e0"|421
|align=center colspan=1| 
|
|- 
! 9
|align=center|9-simplex
|align=center|9-cube
|align=center|9-orthoplex
|align=center|9-demicube
|align=center colspan=5| 
|-
! 10
|align=center|10-simplex
|align=center|10-cube
|align=center|10-orthoplex
|align=center|10-demicube
|align=center colspan=5| 
|}
Polytopes
Multi-dimensional geometry